Michael Chang was the defending champion but lost in the second round to Pete Sampras.

Andre Agassi won in the final 6–4, 6–2 against Sampras.

Seeds

  Gustavo Kuerten (semifinals)
  Marat Safin (second round)
  Andre Agassi (champion)
  Pete Sampras (final)
  Jan-Michael Gambill (quarterfinals)
  Carlos Moyá (first round)
  Magnus Norman (quarterfinals)
  Tommy Haas (quarterfinals)

Draw

Finals

Top half

Bottom half

External links
 2001 Mercedes-Benz Cup draw

Los Angeles Open (tennis)
2001 ATP Tour